Stand in the Fire is a live album by American singer-songwriter Warren Zevon, released December 26, 1980. It was recorded in August 1980 during a five-night residency at The Roxy Theatre in West Hollywood, California and featured two new original songs ("Stand in the Fire" and "The Sin") and one new cover ("Bo Diddley's a Gunslinger"). The album was dedicated to Martin Scorsese. 

It was released in a limited edition, LP replica sleeve on CD April 25, 2006 in Japan.  A remastered and expanded edition (four additional tracks) was released on March 26, 2007 in the U.K., March 27, 2007 in the U.S. A deluxe vinyl edition, expanded to a 2-LP set, that includes 10 bonus tracks: 4 songs previously unavailable on vinyl and 6 songs previously unreleased on any format (that is, 20 tracks in total) was released via Rhino Records on 2 April 2021.

Band members Zeke Zirngiebel, Bob Harris and Marty Stinger were in Boulder, a band signed to Elektra Records. The singer was Stan Bush. Their self-titled album was released in 1979 and it included Zevon's "Join Me in L.A." Bob Harris later went on to work with Frank Zappa.

Zevon called the concerts "The Dog Ate the Part We Didn't Like Tour".

Track listing
All songs written by Warren Zevon unless otherwise indicated.
Side one
 "Stand in the Fire" – 3:26
 "Jeannie Needs a Shooter" (Bruce Springsteen, Zevon) – 4:00
 "Excitable Boy" (LeRoy Marinell, Zevon) – 3:52
 "Mohammed's Radio" – 4:45
 "Werewolves of London" (LeRoy Marinell, Waddy Wachtel, Zevon) – 4:48
Side two
 "Lawyers, Guns and Money" – 3:49
 "The Sin" – 3:06
 "Poor Poor Pitiful Me" – 4:08
 "I'll Sleep When I'm Dead" – 4:28
 "Bo Diddley's a Gunslinger" / "Bo Diddley" (Bo Diddley) – 4:15

Bonus Tracks on 2007 Remastered Edition

 "Johnny Strikes Up the Band" – 3:58
 "Play It All Night Long" – 4:50
 "Frank and Jesse James" – 4:27
 "Hasten Down the Wind" – 4:33

Deluxe 2-LP version, released 2 April 2021
 	"Stand in the Fire"
 	"Jeannie Needs a Shooter"
 	"Excitable Boy"
 	"Mohammed’s Radio"
 	"Werewolves of London"
 	"Lawyers, Guns and Money"
 	"The Sin"
 	"Poor Poor Pitiful Me"
 	"I’ll Sleep When I’m Dead"
 	"Bo Diddley’s a Gunslinger/Bo Diddley"
 	"Johnny Strikes Up the Band"
 	"Roland The Headless Thompson Gunner"
 	"Play It All Night Long"
 	"Night Time in the Switching Yard"
 	"Gorilla You’re a Desperado"
 	"Bad Luck Streak in Dancing School"
 	"The Sin" (alternate slightly longer version)
 	"Frank and Jesse James"
 	"Hasten Down The Wind"
 	"A Certain Girl"

Personnel
Warren Zevon – bass, guitar, piano, keyboards, vocals, 12-string guitar
David Landau – lead guitar
Zeke Zirngiebel – guitar, electric guitar, rhythm guitar, steel guitar, vocals, 12-string guitar
Bob Harris – synthesizer, piano, backing vocals
Roberto Piñón – bass, backing vocals
Marty Stinger – drums
Technical
George Gruel – road manager
Jimmy Wachtel, Michael Curtis – art direction, photography
Recorded by Billy Youdelman and Greg Ladanyi
Mixed by Greg Ladanyi, assisted by James Ledner

Charts

References

Warren Zevon live albums
Albums produced by Greg Ladanyi
1981 live albums
Asylum Records live albums
Albums with cover art by Jimmy Wachtel
Albums recorded at the Roxy Theatre